The 1993 Australian 2.0 Litre Touring Car Championship was a CAMS sanctioned Australian motor racing title for drivers of under 2.0-litre cars complying with the provisions of the FISA Class II section of Australian Group 3A Touring Car regulations. It was contested in conjunction with the 1993 Australian Touring Car Championship, which began on 28 February 1993 at Amaroo Park and ended on 8 August at Oran Park Raceway after nine rounds. It was the third Australian 2.0 Litre Touring Car Championship and the first for cars aligned with FISA Class II regulations and thus the fore-runner of the Australian Super Touring Championship.

The championship was won by Peter Doulman, driving a 2.0-litre version of his old Group A BMW M3 (the car was an ex-JPS Team BMW and Mobil 1 Racing team car that had been built by Frank Gardner's JPS Team in 1987. Doulman had raced the car since 1989 with a 2.3 L engine). The championship went down to the wire with Doulman beating out the Caltex Team Toyota of John Smith. Smith's Caltex team boss Colin Bond finished third in the championship despite not being a starter in the final round at Oran Park.

Most of the 2.0 Litre field consisted of regular 'baby car class' competitors from Group A, including Frank Binding, Brad Stratton, Mike Conway, and veteran racer Bob Holden.

Teams and drivers

The following teams and drivers competed in the 1993 Australian 2.0 Litre Touring Car Championship.

Race calendar
The championship was contested over nine rounds, held across six states.

Points system 
All rounds of the 1993 Australian 2.0 Litre Touring Car Championship were staged in conjunction with rounds of the 1993 Australian Touring Car Championship, which was open to both 2.0 Litre Touring Cars and 5.0 Litre Touring Cars.

At the opening round at Amaroo Park both the 2.0 Litre cars and the 5.0 Litre cars had a separate Heat of their own before competing together in the Final. Points towards the 1993 Australian 2.0 Litre Touring Car Championship were awarded on a 9–6–4–3–2–1 basis for the first six positions in the 2.0 Litre Heat.

At the Symmons Plains Raceway round only three 2.0 Litre cars were entered (Doulman, Smith and Bond), and they ran together with the 5.0 Litre cars in both the Heat and the Final. Points for the 2.0 Litre championship were awarded on a 9–6–4–3–2–1 basis for the first six positions in the 2.0 Litre class of the Heat. This practice was continued at all subsequent rounds even after 2.0 Litre grids returned to the size displayed at Amaroo.

Whilst drivers of 2.0 Litre cars finishing in the top ten outright positions in the Final were eligible to score points towards the Australian Touring Car Championship, in reality, no 2.0 Litre car finished in the top ten placings in the Final at any round.

Championship results 

 Positions shown for Round 1 are those achieved in the 2.0 Litre Heat.
 Positions shown for Rounds 2 to 9 are those achieved in the 2.0 Litre class of the combined Heat.

See also
1993 Australian Touring Car season

References

Australian Touring Car Championship
Australian Super Touring Championship
2.0 Litre Touring Car Championship
Australian 2.0 Litre Touring Car Championship